Petar Petrović (born 15 September 1995) is a Swedish footballer who plays as a left midfielder for El Paso Locomotive.

Early life
Petrović was born in Malmö, and is of Serb ethnic descent. His origin is from Niš.

Career

Club career
On 30 November 2012 Petrović signed a first team contract on a youth basis with Malmö FF.
Petrović made his Allsvenskan debut for Malmö FF in an away fixture against Syrianska FC at Södertälje Fotbollsarena on 20 June 2013. On 24 March 2014 Petrović signed a new four year first team contract with the club. On 24 July 2014 he was sent on loan to Serbian side Radnički Niš for the duration of the 2014 season. Petrović was again sent on a loan spell for the first half of the 2015 season, this time to Superettan side IFK Värnamo.

Radnički Niš
In winter 2018, he returns to FK Radnički Niš for the second time. The lunar item for his decision to come to Radnički was patriotism, because he originated from Niš.

Östers IF
On 2 December 2019, Östers IF confirmed the signing of Petrović on a deal for the 2020 season.

El Paso Locomotive
On 12 January 2023, Petrović signed with USL Championship side El Paso Locomotive.

Career statistics
As of 07 March 2019.

References

External links
 Malmö FF profile 
 
 

1995 births
Living people
Swedish footballers
Sweden youth international footballers
Footballers from Skåne County
Malmö FF players
Swedish expatriate footballers
Expatriate footballers in Serbia
FK Radnički Niš players
IFK Värnamo players
IF Brommapojkarna players
Västerås SK Fotboll players
Östers IF players
Allsvenskan players
Serbian SuperLiga players
Superettan players
Swedish people of Serbian descent
Serb diaspora sportspeople
Association football midfielders
El Paso Locomotive FC players
Swedish expatriate sportspeople in the United States
Expatriate soccer players in the United States
Swedish expatriate sportspeople in Serbia